James Bateman (born September 16, 1954) is a Canadian former professional ice hockey player who played in the World Hockey Association (WHA). Drafted in the fifth round of the 1974 NHL amateur draft by the Boston Bruins, Bateman opted to play in the WHA after being selected by the San Diego Mariners in the fourth round of the 1974 WHA Amateur Draft. He played parts of two seasons for the Mariners.

References

External links

1954 births
Living people
Anglophone Quebec people
Boston Bruins draft picks
Canadian ice hockey defencemen
Canadian ice hockey left wingers
Greensboro Generals (SHL) players
Ice hockey people from Quebec
Quebec Remparts players
Roanoke Valley Rebels (SHL) players
Saint-Jérôme Alouettes players
San Diego Mariners draft picks
San Diego Mariners players
Sportspeople from Thetford Mines
Syracuse Blazers players
Tucson Mavericks players